Fluke is a 1995 fantasy drama film directed by Carlo Carlei and starring Matthew Modine as the voice of the title character with supporting roles featuring Eric Stoltz, Nancy Travis, Max Pomeranc, Bill Cobbs, Ron Perlman, Jon Polito and Samuel L. Jackson as the voice of Rumbo. The film was based on the 1977 novel of the same name by James Herbert.

Released in theaters on June 2, 1995, the film was a box-office bomb, grossing just $3,987,768 against a budget of $15 million, and received negative reviews from critics.

Plot  
A mutt puppy who has flashing memories and dreams of having lived a human life is taken to a pound and eventually escapes. He is raised by an elderly homeless woman named Bella, who gives him the name Fluke, stating that he is a "fluke by nature, Fluke by name." Fluke supports Bella by helping her earn money from passing strangers, who are impressed with Fluke's ability to beat Bella's shell game.

After Bella dies of an illness, Fluke meets a street-wise dog named Rumbo who takes him to see a man named Bert who feeds them. Fluke matures into an adult dog and eventually realizes that he was once a man named Thomas P. Johnson, who died in a car crash.

Fluke is abducted by a man named Sylvester to be used in makeup experiments at a cosmetics company. During his captivity, Rumbo comes to the rescue, but is shot by Sylvester as he and Fluke escape. A dying Rumbo tells Fluke that the black-and-white snapshot of a man in a sailor suit on Bert's wall was him and Bert was his brother and that he wishes to smell the sea again, suggesting that he died in the line of duty.

After Rumbo's death, Fluke seeks out his surviving wife Carol and son Brian and reunites with them by becoming their new family dog. Though Carol is apprehensive about adopting Fluke, she caves in, seeing how Brian has quickly bonded with Fluke. During his life as a dog, Fluke gets to know his family better and realizes that he had been a distant workaholic.

As more memories return, Fluke suspects that his human death was caused by his former business partner, Jeff Newman. Enraged by this and that Jeff is now dating Carol, Fluke viciously attacks him when he visits the house, and ends up getting put outside. Jeff calls for Animal Control against the protests of Brian, and Fluke is forced to run from the premises.

The next night, Brian goes missing while looking for Fluke and Carol implores Jeff to help, so Jeff drives back to their house. Fluke, hiding in the backseat of Jeff's car, comes close to killing Jeff by causing him to get into a car accident like his own. Fluke then has another flashback and realizes that Jeff wasn't responsible for his death. Instead, Fluke had caused his own death when he recklessly drove on the wrong side of the road just to argue with Jeff one night and swerved off to avoid hitting an oncoming truck. Jeff later tried to save him, but failed. An injured Jeff, implied to have realized Fluke's true identity but bearing no ill will, tells Fluke to go find Brian before the latter catches hypothermia from the falling snow. Regretful over his actions, Fluke barks for a passing driver to help Jeff before running off.

On a hunch, Fluke goes to the graveyard where he had been buried and finds Brian there, who had been locked in by an unaware groundskeeper. Fluke huddles with Brian to keep him warm. Carol, deducing from one of Brian's drawings where he may have gone, uses her car to break open the cemetery gates and picks up Brian. Carol tries to coax Fluke to come home with them. Instead, Fluke digs away at the snow in front of his tombstone to show Carol who he really is by uncovering the word "forever" at the bottom, a phrase he often said to her as a human. Carol is left speechless, and lets Fluke leave without objection. With a heavy heart, Fluke departs and entrusts his family to Jeff for their happiness. He monologues that he finally accepted that he can no longer be the family man he should have been, and that he should just cherish the life he has now.

Sometime later, Fluke is resting under a tree on a farm by himself. To his surprise and happiness, he is reunited with Rumbo, now reincarnated as a squirrel. Rumbo tells Fluke about life as a squirrel and about reincarnation.

Cast 
 Buddy as Fluke, a dog that was reincarnated after a business man's death
 Matthew Modine as Thomas P. Johnson, a workaholic, Jeff's best friend, Carol's husband, and Brian's father. As Fluke the dog, his struggle to return to his former human life ultimately teaches him the importance of moving on
 Nancy Travis as Carol Johnson, Thomas's wife, Brian's mother. Throughout the movie, she's shown to be not fond of dogs and is even borderline hostile towards Fluke. By the end of the movie, she is implied to have increased empathy for animals after realizing Fluke's true identity
 Max Pomeranc as Brian Johnson, Thomas and Carol's son. Despite Thomas's workaholic ways, Brian remembers his dad fondly, and is shown to miss him dearly
 Eric Stoltz as Jeff Newman, Thomas's best friend. In the years since Thomas's death, he has begun to fill the void Thomas left behind
 Bill Cobbs as Bert
 Ron Perlman as Sylvester
 Jon Polito as Boss
 Collin Wilcox Paxton as Bella, a kindly old homeless lady who cares for Fluke for some time until her death
 Georgia Allen as Rose, a cleaning lady

Voices 
 Matthew Modine as Fluke
 Sam Gifaldi as Young Fluke
 Samuel L. Jackson as Rumbo, Fluke's best friend

Production
Italian filmaker Carlo Carlei wrote the adaptation of James Herbert's Fluke with co-writer James Carrington with the intention of getting the film greenlit at a major Hollywood studio. Carlei had come close to getting the film greenlit at Paramount Pictures for producer Fred Roos, but the departure of Sid Ganis as the studio's Head of Production derailed development. Then Metro-Goldwyn-Mayer co-chairman and chief executive officer Alan Ladd Jr. upon screening Carlei's Flight of the Innocent was impressed enough where Ladd acquired Flight of the Innocent for U.S. distribution and signed Carlei to a one picture deal with Fluke being greenlit.

Release 
Fluke underperformed at the box office, generating just under $4 million in America. Fluke was released on VHS on November 21, 1995 and LaserDisc on November 28, 1995 by MGM/UA Home Video in North America (which was presented in the theatrical version and available exclusively through Warner Home Video). Fluke was also released on VHS on November 5, 1996 by MGM/UA Family Entertainment in North America (which has been edited for family viewing and was also available exclusively through Warner Home Video). In Japan, Fluke was released on VHS on July 5, 1996 by Warner Home Video under the MGM/UA Family Entertainment label (which was presented in the theatrical version).

Reception 
On Rotten Tomatoes, the film has a 25% rating based on 12 reviews with an average rating of 3.8/10. However, it was nominated in 1996 by the Academy of Science Fiction, Fantasy & Horror Films for Best Fantasy Film and Best Performance by a Younger Actor for Max Pomeranc.

See also 
 Oh! Heavenly Dog (1980 film)
 All Dogs Go to Heaven (1989 film)
 Quigley (2003 film)
 A Dog's Purpose (2017 film)
 Dog House (TV series)

References

External links 
 
 
 
 Fluke at Box Office Mojo

1995 films
Metro-Goldwyn-Mayer films
Films about dogs
Metaphysical fiction films
Films about reincarnation
Films directed by Carlo Carlei
Films about animal rights
American drama films
Films based on British novels
Films scored by Carlo Siliotto
Films produced by Paul Maslansky
1990s English-language films
1990s American films